The J. A. Fritsch Block is a historic three-story building in Salt Lake City, Utah. It was built in 1890 for the Fritsch Investment Company, co-founded by Francis Fritsch, an immigrant from Germany, and his son John. It was designed in the Richardsonian Romanesque style by Carroll & Kern. The second and third floor were used as hotel rooms, first known as the Worth Hotel and later as the Granite Hotel. The building was purchased by Lorus Manwaring, Sr., the owner of a bicycle store, in 1931–1932. It has been listed on the National Register of Historic Places since July 30, 1976.

References

Hotel buildings on the National Register of Historic Places in Utah
National Register of Historic Places in Salt Lake City
Romanesque Revival architecture in Utah
Buildings and structures completed in 1890
1890 establishments in Utah Territory